In the Unified Modeling Language 1.x, powertype is a keyword for a specific UML stereotype, and  applies to a class or dependency.  Powertype shows a classifier whose instances (objects) are children of the given parent.

In UML 2.x, a powertype is a metaclass whose instances are subclasses of a given class. The stereotype has been removed and the powertype is now indicated by typing the generalization set.

In the UML Superstructure 2.4.1 Specification Document the following definition is given:

References 

Unified Modeling Language